A podium sweep is when one team wins all available medals in a single event in a sporting event. It is often a rare occurrence that often happens in athletics, cycling and swimming. Since the Paralympic Games started in 1960, there have been 60 podium sweeps (updated to the 2016 Summer Paralympics).

Archery

There has been one occasion where there has been a podium sweep in archery.

Athletics

There are 26 podium sweeps in track and field athletics in the Paralympic Games.

Cycling

Lawn bowls

Swimming

Table tennis

Wheelchair tennis

Wheelchair fencing

See also
List of Paralympic records in athletics
List of Paralympic records in cycling
List of Paralympic records in swimming

References

Paralympic medalists